The common remora (Remora remora) is a pelagic marine fish belonging to family Echeneidae. The dorsal fin, which has 22 to 26 soft rays, acts as a suction cup, creating a vacuum to allow it to attach to larger marine animals, such as whales, dolphins, sharks, and sea turtles.

Physical characteristics
The common remora has a suckerlike dorsal fin and an anal fin. Its body can be brown, black or grey in color. It can reach   in total length, though most do not exceed .

Biology and behavior
R. remora and its host seem to partake in a symbiotic relationship; the common remora does not seem to have a negative overall effect on its host. The host provides the remora with fast-moving water to bathe its gills, a steady flow of food, transportation, and protection. The remora benefits the host by feeding in part on some of its parasites, but increases its hydrodynamical drag. The common remora's attachment to one host can last for up to three months. During this time, the remora can move its attachment site if it feels threatened. The common remora cannot survive in still water; it needs water flow over its gills to provide it oxygen.

Habitat
This remora is commonly found in warm marine waters and has been seen in the western Mediterranean and the Atlantic, as well as the North Sea.

Reproduction
A mating couple may attach to the same host, and have host fidelity. It is not clear when during the year the common remora spawns, and little is known about the fish's reproductive behavior.

Food and diet
The remora consumes food scraps from its host, as well as plankton and parasitic copepods.

Significance to humans
No known negative impacts for humans are known. Remoras can be caught as fishing bycatch and put in aquaria. Remoras have been used in fishing - one method involves tying fishing line to the remora, then waiting for it to cling to a larger fish.

Other common names for this familiar fish include suck fish, stout sucking fish, common sucker, shark-sucker, brown sucker, and shark pilot.

References

External links
 

common remora
Cosmopolitan fish
common remora
common remora